Anisimovskaya is a rural locality (a village) in Shelotskoye Rural Settlement, Verkhovazhsky District, Vologda Oblast, Russia. The population was 6 as of 2002.

Geography 
The distance to Verkhovazhye is 81.5 km, to Shelota is 12 km. Stolbovo is the nearest rural locality.

References 

Rural localities in Verkhovazhsky District